Strunino is a town in Alexandrovsky District of Vladimir Oblast, Russia, located  northwest of Vladimir, the administrative center of the oblast. Population:

History
The village of Strunino has been known since 1492. It was granted town status in 1938.

Administrative and municipal status
Within the framework of administrative divisions, Strunino is directly subordinated to Alexandrovsky District. As a municipal division, the town of Strunino is incorporated within Alexandrovsky Municipal District as Strunino Urban Settlement.

References

Notes

Sources

Cities and towns in Vladimir Oblast
Alexandrovsky Uyezd (Vladimir Governorate)